{{DISPLAYTITLE:C24H46O4}}
The molecular formula C24H46O4 (molar mass: 398.62 g/mol, exact mass: 398.3396 u) may refer to:

 Nebraskanic acid
 Dilauroyl peroxide